Thomas Pettersen is a Norwegian handball player.

He made his debut on the Norwegian national team in 1998, and played 21 matches for the national team between 1998 and 2001. He competed at the 1999 World Men's Handball Championship.

References

Year of birth missing (living people)
Living people
Norwegian male handball players